Castiglione Falletto is a comune (municipality) in the Province of Cuneo in the Italian region Piedmont, located about  southeast of Turin and about  northeast of Cuneo. 

Castiglione Falletto borders the following municipalities: Alba, Barolo, La Morra, Monforte d'Alba, and Serralunga d'Alba.

Twin towns
 Muntelier, Switzerland

References

Cities and towns in Piedmont